Trading Houses is a New Zealand Reality Show where couples trade wives and renovate each other's house.

External links
TV2

See also 
 Trading Spaces — the American version of the programme
 Changing Rooms — the British version of the programme

New Zealand reality television series
TVNZ 2 original programming